The Perruchet effect is a psychological phenomenon in which a dissociation is shown between conscious expectation of an event and the strength or speed of a response to the event. This can be demonstrated by sequential analyses of consecutive trials such as cued go/no task. It is revealed that reaction times toward the occurrence of a target and participants' expectancies for the target decrease during the process. The dissociation design differentiates the automatic associative strength and (propositional) expectation's effects. 

The Perruchet effect is considered a type of non-local influence on behavior. It goes against the view that conscious inferences about the relations between events are the offshoot of human conditioned responses.

References

Psychological effects